Arthur Louis "Buddy" Schumacher (1916–1925) was an 8-year-old from Wauwatosa, Wisconsin who was found murdered in 1925. The murder has not been solved.

Early life
Buddy was born on September 2, 1916 to Arthur "Art" Schumacher and Florence May Zapp (Armstrong) Schumacher. He had an older sister, Jeanette Alice, who was born on April 11, 1915. Buddy attended Lincoln Elementary School in Wauwatosa.

Disappearance
Schumacher went missing on July 24, 1925. He left his house with some neighborhood boys about 9 a.m. and never returned. He was last seen by three of his friends after they hopped off a freight train they’d jumped to get a ride to a nearby swimming hole. For seven weeks, the community and state searched desperately to find the boy until his body was found just a mile from his house with his clothing torn and a handkerchief shoved down his throat. The police pursued several promising leads, but to no avail.

Aftermath
Buddy was the subject of a nonfiction book, Murder in Wauwatosa: The Mysterious Death of Buddy Schumacher, written by former Wauwatosa, Wisconsin resident Paul J. Hoffman that was published in 2012 by The History Press. Hoffman's father, Raymond Hoffman, purchased a house at 8118 Hillcrest Drive in Wauwatosa in 1969 from Buddy's father that the Schumachers had moved into about two years after Buddy died. Raymond Hoffman owned the house until 2004.

See also
List of solved missing person cases
List of unsolved murders

References

1916 births
1920s missing person cases
1925 deaths
1925 murders in the United States
Formerly missing people
Male murder victims
Missing person cases in Wisconsin
People murdered in Wisconsin
Unsolved murders in the United States
Wauwatosa, Wisconsin